USS LCI(L)-19 was an amphibious assault ship commissioned in 1943 by the United States Navy and assigned to the Mediterranean theater during World War II. As part of Operation Husky, LCI(L)-19 participated in the allied landings in Sicily from 9–15 July 1943. From 9–21 September 1943 LCI(L)-19 took part in the Salerno landings during Operation Avalanche.

LCI(L)-19 saw action during Operation Shingle as part of the Anzio and Nettuno advanced landings on 22 January – 5 February 1944. She took part in Operation Dragoon, the invasion of southern France, from 15 August – 28 September 1944. After her service in the Mediterranean LCI(L)-19 was transferred to Pacific theater.

On 15 July 1945 LCI(L)-19 was re-designated Landing Craft Guns LCI(G)-19. Following the end of World War II, LCI(G)-19 served in the occupation of the Far East.

After decommissioning, LCI(G)-19 was sold on 5 February 1947.

See also
Landing Craft Infantry
List of United States Navy Landing Craft Infantry (LCI)
List of United States Navy amphibious warfare ships

Awards, citations and campaign ribbons

References
 "USS LCI(L)-19" NavSource Online. NavSource Naval History. Retrieved 2010-02-02.
 "Landing Craft, Infantry (Large) – LCI(L)" Shipbuilding History. Retrieved 2010-02-02.

External links
 http://www.usslci.com

1943 ships
Landing craft
Amphibious warfare vessels of the United States Navy
Ships built by New York Shipbuilding Corporation